STS-51-L was the 25th mission of the NASA Space Shuttle program and the final flight of Space Shuttle Challenger.

Planned as the first Teacher in Space Project flight in addition to observing Halley's Comet for six days and performing a routine satellite deployment, the mission never achieved orbit; a structural failure during its ascent phase 73 seconds after launch from Kennedy Space Center Launch Complex 39B on January 28, 1986, killed all seven crew members —Commander Francis R. "Dick" Scobee, Pilot Michael J. Smith, Mission Specialists Ellison S. Onizuka, Judith A. Resnik and Ronald E. McNair, and Payload Specialists Gregory B. Jarvis and S. Christa McAuliffe—and destroyed the orbiter.

Immediately after the disaster, President Ronald Reagan convened the Rogers Commission to determine the cause of the explosion. The failure of an O-ring seal on the starboard Solid Rocket Booster (SRB) was determined to have caused the shuttle to break up in flight. Space Shuttle flights were suspended while the O-rings and other hazards that could have destroyed the vehicle on following missions were addressed. Shuttle missions resumed in September 1988 with STS-26, launched 32 months after the accident.

Planned mission
The tenth mission for Challenger, STS-51-L, was scheduled to deploy the second in a series of Tracking and Data Relay Satellites (TDRS-B), carry out the first flight of the "Shuttle Pointed Autonomous Research Tool for Astronomy" (SPARTAN-203) / Halley's Comet Experiment Deployable in order to observe Halley's Comet, and carry out several lessons from space as part of the Teacher in Space Project and Shuttle Student Involvement Program (SSIP). The flight marked the first American orbital mission to involve in-flight fatalities. It was also the first American human spaceflight mission to launch and fail to reach space; the first such mission in the world had been the Soviet Soyuz 18a mission, in which the two crew members had survived. Gregory Jarvis was originally scheduled to fly on the previous shuttle flight (STS-61-C), but he was reassigned to this flight and replaced by Congressman Clarence W. "Bill" Nelson.

Crew

Backup crew

Crew seating arrangement

Although the crew died in the Challenger disaster, their seating assignment chart depicts what would have happened if the mission had been performed as planned.

Ascent failure and disaster

During the ascent phase, 73 seconds after liftoff, the vehicle experienced a catastrophic structural failure resulting in the loss of crew and vehicle. The Rogers Commission later determined the cause of the accident to have been the failure of the primary and secondary (backup) O-ring seals on Challengers right Solid Rocket Booster (SRB). The failure of these seals allowed a flamethrower-like flare to impinge upon one of two aft SRB attach struts, which eventually failed, freeing the booster to pivot about its remaining attachment points. The forward part of the booster cylinder struck the external tank inter-tank area, leading to a structural failure of the Space Shuttle external tank (ET) – the core structural component of the entire stack. A rapid burning of liberated propellants ensued. With the structural "backbone" of the stack compromised and breaking up, the SRBs flew off on their own, as did the orbiter, which rapidly disintegrated due to overwhelming aerodynamic forces. Evidence found in the remnants of the crew cabin showed that several of the emergency Personal Egress Air Packs (PEAPs) carried by the astronauts had been manually activated, suggesting that forces experienced inside the cabin during breakup of the orbiter were not inherently fatal, and that at least three crew members were alive and capable of conscious action for a period following vehicle breakup. "Tracking reported that the vehicle had exploded and impacted the water in an area approximately located at 28.64° north, 80.28° west".

Crew fate
Divers from the  located what they believed to be the crew cabin on the ocean floor on March 7, 1986. A dive the following day confirmed that it was the cabin and that the remains of the crew were inside. No official investigation into the Challenger disaster has determined the cause of death of the astronauts; it is almost certain that the disintegration itself did not kill the entire crew as 3 of the 4 Personal Egress Air Packs (PEAPs) that were recovered had been manually activated. This would only be done during an emergency or loss of cabin pressure. PEAPs do not provide a pressurized air flow and would still have resulted in the astronauts losing consciousness within several seconds. There were media reports alleging that NASA had a tape recording of the crew panicking and on-board conversation following the disintegration during the 2 minute 45 second free fall before hitting the sea east of Florida. This was likely fabricated and no recording exists, as the crew may have been unconscious from loss of cabin pressure and the astronauts did not wear individual voice recorders.

Mission objectives 
 Deployment of Tracking Data Relay Satellite-B (TDRS-B) with an Inertial Upper Stage (IUS) booster
 Flight of "Shuttle Pointed Autonomous Research Tool for Astronomy" (SPARTAN-203)/Halley's Comet Experiment Deployable
 Fluid Dynamics Experiment (FDE)
 Comet Halley Active Monitoring Program (CHAMP)
 Phase Partitioning Experiment (PPE)
 Three Shuttle Student Involvement Program (SSIP) experiments
 Two lessons for the Teacher in Space Project (TISP)
 (unofficial) Ronald E. McNair was planning to play the saxophone in space for a track on Jean-Michel Jarre's album "Rendez-Vous".

Mission insignia 
Francis R. "Dick" Scobee asked Kennedy Space Center engineer Ernie Reyes to design the mission patch seen above to represent the mission STS-51-L. In it, Challenger is depicted launching from Florida and soaring into space to carry out a variety of goals. Among the prescribed duties of the five astronauts and two payload specialists (represented by the seven stars of the U.S. flag) was observation and photography of Halley's Comet, backdropped against the U.S. flag in the insignia. Surnames of the crew members encircle the scene, with the payload specialists being recognized below. The surname of the first teacher in space, S. Christa McAuliffe, is followed by a symbolic apple.

See also 

 Apollo 1
 STS-51-L mission timeline
 Space Shuttle Columbia disaster
 Space Shuttle program
 Challenger Center for Space Science Education

References

External links 
 Report of the Presidential Commission on the Space Shuttle Challenger Accident
 Spartan 203 (Spartan Halley, HCED)

1986 in spaceflight
Space accidents and incidents in the United States
Space Shuttle missions
Space program fatalities
Space Shuttle Challenger disaster
Spacecraft launched in 1986
1986 in Florida
January 1986 events
Rocket launches in 1986